Bychowo may refer to the following places in Poland:
Bychowo, Lower Silesian Voivodeship (south-west Poland)
Bychowo, Pomeranian Voivodeship (north Poland)